The  is a commuter rail line in  Chiba Prefecture, Japan, operated by  between Mabashi Station in Matsudo and Nagareyama Station in Nagareyama. The present line name was the most popular short name of the line. It was also called .

This is the only line Ryūtetsu operates, making the company unique for being an independent railway operator with just a single 5.7 km line and no major subsidiary businesses (unlike Yamaman or The Oriental Land Company and their Disney Resort Line). The short line functions as a link between the centre of the city of Nagareyama and the East Japan Railway Company (JR East) Jōban Line. However, after the opening of the Tsukuba Express on August 24, 2005, ridership fell sharply. Suica and PASMO contactless smart cards cannot be used, and Ryūtetsu reportedly has no plans to introduce the system on the line.

Basic data
Double-tracking: None
Railway signalling: Automatic Train Stop
Passing loop: Kogane-Jōshi Station

History

The company renamed  in November 1922 and rebuilt the railway track to  gauge in 1924.

The company name was again changed to Nagareyama Electric Railway (Nagareyama Denki Tetsudō) in 1949, to Nagareyama Electric Railway (Nagareyama Dentetsu) in 1967, to Sōbu Nagareyama Electric Railway in 1971 and to Ryūtetsu in 2008.

Stations
All stations are in Chiba Prefecture.

References

External links 
  

Railway lines in Japan
Railway lines in Chiba Prefecture
1067 mm gauge railways in Japan
Railway lines opened in 1916
2 ft 6 in gauge railways in Japan
1916 establishments in Japan